R-15 regional road (previously known as R-16 regional road) is a Montenegrin roadway.

History

In January 2016, the Ministry of Transport and Maritime Affairs published a bylaw on categorisation of state roads. With new categorisation, R-16 regional road was renamed as R-15 regional road.

Major intersections

References

R-15